Lunej is a village in Khambhat taluka of Anand district, Gujarat, India. The main occupation of the people of Lunej village is agriculture, farming and animal husbandry. The first the mineral oil well in Gujarat, was founded in Lunej.

References

Villages in Anand district